Harley Cross (born March 10, 1978) is an American entrepreneur, film/television actor and producer.

He is currently the Director of Strategy for Land Core, a 501(c)3 non-profit that he co-founded in 2018 advancing soil health programs and policies that create value for farmers, businesses, and communities.

He was co-founder, CEO, and artistic director of Hint Mint Inc., a designer breath mint/candy company that was master licensed to Giftcraft LLC (a Toronto-based gift company) in 2016.

In 2015 he co-created the after-school music education program Play with Music, which focuses on bringing relevant music education to at-risk youth. The program is currently running at Allen Leroy Locke High School in South Los Angeles.

Cross was also the co-founder of Interconnected, a Los Angeles-based creative agency and production company, that he started in 2011 with his friend and business partner Nirvan Mullick. Through Interconnected, Cross and Mullick produced the viral video Caine's Arcade and the follow-up Caine's Arcade 2. After the viral success of Caine's Arcade, Cross and Mullick co-founded the Imagination Foundation, a non-profit organization whose mission is to "find, foster and fund creativity and entrepreneurship in kids".

As an actor Cross appeared in over a dozen films as well as many TV shows in the 1980s and 1990s including cult films The Believers, Someone To Watch Over Me, The Fly II, Cohen and Tate, and the TV series Sister Kate and Dudley. His most recent roles were in the 2000 film Shriek If You Know What I Did Last Friday the Thirteenth and the 2004 film Kinsey.

Cross was also the frontman of The Harley Cross Band in the early 2000s and has recently started a new music project with Lauren Turk called The New History.

Personal life
Cross was born in New York City, New York but spent much of his childhood in Paris, France; Haiti; and Los Angeles, California. He is the older brother of actress Flora Cross and actor Eli Marienthal.

Films and TV
 Mrs. Soffel (1984, by Gillian Armstrong) – Clarence Soffel (film debut)
 Alex: The live from a child (1986 TV movie) – Chris (ages 6 to 8)
 Where are the Children? (1986) – Michael Eldridge
 The Believers (1987, by John Schlesinger) – Chris Jamison
 Someone to Watch Over Me (1987, by Ridley Scott) – Tommy Keegan
 A Hobo's Christmas (1987 TV movie) – Bobby Grovner
 Once Again (1987 TV movie)
 Cohen and Tate (1988) – Travis Knight
 The Fly II (1989) – Martin (age 10)
 Sister Kate (1989 TV series) – Eugene Colodner
 Stanley & Iris (1990, by Martin Ritt) – Richard King
 The Boy Who Cried Bitch (1991) – Dan Love
 Law & Order (TV series) – episode "Trust" (1992) – Jamie Maser
 Dudley (1993 TV series) – Fred Bristol
 To Dance with the White Dog (1993 TV movie) – Bobby
 Crazy for a Kiss (1995 TV movie) – Ray Striker
 Touched by an Angel (TV series) – episode "The Quality of Mercy" (1996) – Marshall Redding
 Perdita Durango (1997) – Duane
 A Soldier's Daughter Never Cries (1998, by James Ivory) – Keith Carter
 Interstate 84 (2000) – Freddie
 Shriek If You Know What I Did Last Friday the Thirteenth (2000 video) – Dawson Deary
 Robbie's Brother (2001) – Robbie
 Kinsey (2004) – Young Man in Gay Bar

References

Bibliography
 Holmstrom, John. The Moving Picture Boy: An International Encyclopaedia from 1895 to 1995, Norwich, Michael Russell, 1996, p. 398.

External links
 

1978 births
American male film actors
American male television actors
Jewish American male actors
Living people
Male actors from New York City
Film producers from New York (state)
21st-century American Jews